Events in the year 2011 in Burkina Faso.

Incumbents 

 President: Blaise Compaoré
 Prime Minister: Tertius Zongo (until April 18) Luc-Adolphe Tiao (from April 18)

Events

April 

 April 15 – Curfew is temporarily set in the capital after mutineers burn down government buildings, with associating riots resulting in the injuries of 45 people. Resulting governmental changes include the prime minister and foreign affairs minister being replaced.

May 
May 23 – In support for better working conditions for teachers, thousands of students march through the streets of the capital.

September 
September 14 – The governments of Burkina Faso and Niger announce they will not allow recently ousted Muammar Qaddafi into the country for haven.

December 
December 15 - Victoria's Secret incurs a scandal in which they are revealed to have been sourcing their cotton from child labor farms in Burkina Faso, protested by many human rights groups.

Deaths

References 

 
2010s in Burkina Faso
Years of the 21st century in Burkina Faso
Burkina Faso
Burkina Faso